Pharmakon is the solo experimental music project of Margaret Chardiet (born June 19, 1990), based out of New York City and formed in 2007. Pharmakon's live musical act has been described as confrontational and concise, attempting to "cross the boundary between performer and audience". Her songs are completely prearranged both live and in recordings, more focused on perfecting a sound rather than generating randomness in noise.

History 
Growing up in New York City, Chardiet has been a prominent figure in the underground, experimental music scene since the age of 17. Her involvement in this scene  helped inspire her to create her music.

Her self-titled debut EP was released on the BloodLust! label in 2009.

Signing to Sacred Bones Records, she released her first full-length album, Abandon, in 2013.

For her second full-length release, Bestial Burden, Chardiet stated that the main inspiration for the album was her abrupt surgery, explaining that her experiences made her feel a disconnect with her physical body and her mind.

The third Pharmakon album, Contact, was released by Sacred Bones on March 31, 2017.

Chardiet released her fourth full-length Pharmakon album, Devour, on August 30, 2019.

Discography 
Pharmakon (2009, BloodLust!)
Abandon (2013, Sacred Bones Records)
Bestial Burden (2014, Sacred Bones Records)
Contact (2017, Sacred Bones Records)
Devour (2019, Sacred Bones Records)

External links
 Pharmakon Bandcamp

References 

American experimental musicians
1990 births
Living people
American noise musicians
American industrial musicians
Musicians from New York City
Sacred Bones Records artists
American women in electronic music
Power electronics musicians
21st-century American women